The 1997 South American Championships in Athletics were held in Mar del Plata, Argentina between 4 and 6 April.

Medal summary

Men's events

Women's events

Medal table

External links
 Men Results – GBR Athletics
 Women Results – GBR Athletics

S
South American Championships in Athletics
1997 in South American sport
International athletics competitions hosted by Argentina
1997 in Argentine sport